Nayika Devi: The Warrior Queen is a 2022 Gujarati historical drama film directed by Nitin Gawde and produced by Umesh Sharma. It is based on the life of Solanki Rajput Queen Naiki Devi, played by Khushi Shah, a warrior queen known for defeating Muhammad of Ghor, played by Chunky Panday, the film is based on Battle of Kasahrada. It was released on 6 May 2022.

Premise
Nayika Devi, the Warrior Queen is a historical drama set in the 12th century. The film is about India's first female warrior. Tale of Chaulukya, queen of Gujarat, who not only ruled Patan for years but also overthrew Muhammad Ghori on the battlefield in 1178.

Cast
Khushi Shah as Nayika Devi
Chunky Panday as Muhammad of Ghor
Manoj Joshi as Kumarapala
Chirag Jani as Ajayapala
Jayesh More
Ojas Rawal
Kaushambi Bhatt
Mamta Soni
Chetan Daiya
Binda Rawal
Brinda Trivedi 
Ragi Jani
Mustafa Askari
Morli Patel
Aakash Zala
Hari Rathod
Anuresh Ninad
Vinayak Ketkar
Aayush Jadeja
Jignesh Trivedi as Acharya Hemachandra
Bhavya Sirohi as Patan Girl

Soundtrack
The music of the film is composed by Parth Bharat Thakkar and lyrics are written by Chirag Tripathi.

Release 
The film was released theatrically on 6 May 2022.

References

External links
 

2022 films
2022 drama films
Indian historical drama films
2020s Gujarati-language films